Luc Brodeur-Jourdain (born March 17, 1983) is a Canadian football offensive line coach for the Montreal Alouettes of the Canadian Football League (CFL). Prior to his coaching career, he played in 11 seasons as an offensive lineman for the Alouettes. He was a member of both the 97th Grey Cup and 98th Grey Cup championship team with the Alouettes.

Amateur career
Brodeur-Jourdain played for the Géants du CÉGEP de Saint-Jean-Sur-Richelieu at the collégial AAA level. He then played CIS football for the Laval Rouge et Or from 2004 to 2008. He was a Vanier Cup champion with the Rouge et Or in 2004, 2006, and 2008.

Professional career
Brodeur-Jourdain was drafted by the Alouettes in the sixth round with the last pick of the 2008 CFL Draft. He returned to play his final year of university eligibility in 2008 and re-joined the Alouettes in 2009. After sitting out week 1, he played in his first professional game in week 2 on July 9, 2009, against the Edmonton Eskimos. He played in 17 regular season games with seven starts in 2009 and played in both post-season games as he finished the year as a Grey Cup champion following the Alouettes' victory in the 97th Grey Cup game. In his sophomore season, Brodeur-Jourdain played in all 18 regular season games, starting in 10, as well as both post-season games as he repeated as a champion with a 98th Grey Cup victory.

Brodeur-Jourdain was named the Alouettes' Most Outstanding Lineman in 2013 and was a CFL all-star in 2012. He was also an East division all-star in 2012 and 2014. Prior to the Alouettes' 2019 Week 4 match against the Hamilton Tiger-Cats, Brodeur-Jourdain announced his intention to retire following the game. He played in 12 seasons for the Alouettes where he played in 168 regular season games and started in 127 games.

Coaching career
A few days after playing in his last game and retiring, Brodeur-Jourdain was hired as an assistant offensive line coach for the Alouettes. He was promoted to offensive line coach on December 2, 2020.

References

External links
Montreal Alouettes bio

1983 births
Living people
Canadian football offensive linemen
French Quebecers
Laval Rouge et Or football players
Montreal Alouettes players
Players of Canadian football from Quebec
Sportspeople from Saint-Hyacinthe